Rosa Maria Pires Weber (born 2 October 1948) is a Brazilian judge and current president of the Supreme Federal Court (STF) of Brazil, former president of the Superior Electoral Court (TSE), and a former member of the Superior Labour Court (TST).

References

|-

|-

|-

|-

|-

|-

|-

1948 births
Living people
21st-century judges
21st-century women judges
Brazilian jurists
Brazilian people of German descent
Brazilian women judges
Constitutional court women judges
People from Porto Alegre
Supreme Federal Court of Brazil justices